An Lập is a commune (xã) and village in Dầu Tiếng District, Bình Dương Province, in Southeast Vietnam.

References

Populated places in Bình Dương province
Communes of Bình Dương province